An armed response vehicle (ARV) is a type of police car operated by police forces in the United Kingdom. ARVs are crewed by authorised firearms officers (AFOs) to respond to incidents believed to involve firearms or other high-risk situations. ARVs are specially adapted and modified to accommodate specialist equipment.

Introduction of ARVs 

Armed response vehicles were introduced to British police forces to provide them with a firearms response capability, as police in the United Kingdom (except Northern Ireland) do not routinely carry firearms on patrol, with the exception of a minority of armed officers.

ARVs are identifiable in London by a yellow dot sticker, visible from each angle, and an asterisk on the roof to enable helicopters to identify the vehicle as being an ARV. Vehicles of the Metropolitan Police's Protection Command, identifiable by their red paintwork, use the same yellow dot markings to denote the carrying of firearms officers.

ARVs were deployed officially for the first time in London, during 1991. An "unpublicised" ARV was deployed in the Brixton area after the riots and was operational in the 1980s, code name Lima Delta 53. This had the standard Smith & Wesson revolvers and was on patrol at all times. Following their success, forces outside of the capital later formed similar units during the early to mid-1990s. The concept of an ARV was influenced by West Yorkshire Police's instant response cars, as used from 1976.

Early ARVs contained a secure safe between the seats containing a .38 Smith & Wesson Model 10 for each member, with two 9mm Heckler & Koch MP5 semi-automatic carbines secured in the boot. After ARVs became established and the practice was accepted for widespread use, the Model 10 revolvers were replaced by the semi-automatic Glock 17 handgun chambered in 9×19mm. In 2010, the Heckler & Koch G36C 5.56mm carbine was introduced in case of a Mumbai style terrorist attack.

Revolvers and pistols could be removed from the secure safe by ARV members if, in a member's opinion, an immediate threat to life was posed. Authorisation for this from the control room was required, including contacting an officer of Association of Chief Police Officers (ACPO) rank. If a high-ranking officer was not available, a Chief Inspector could give authorisation in an emergency. Following an increase in the size of the Firearms Unit, Commissioner Sir Paul Condon issued regulations, effective 23 May 1994, that gave ARV crews standing authority to wear their handguns overtly and to deploy their weapons. Several police forces followed suit. The Greater Manchester police became one of those whose ARVs openly carried firearms beginning 6 September 1994. In 2013, the inaugural Chief Constable of Police Scotland granted a standing authority for ARV crews to overtly wear handguns and to deploy their weapons when he introduced ARV patrols nationally.

Legal status of the use of firearms 

The usage of firearms by the police is covered by statute (such as the Police and Criminal Evidence Act 1984 and Human Rights Act 1998), policy (such as the Home Office Code of Practice on Police use of Firearms and Less Lethal Weapons and the ACPO Manual of Guidance on Police Use of Firearms) and common law.

AFOs may only carry firearms when authorised by an "appropriate authorising officer". The appropriate authorising officer must be of the rank of Inspector or higher. When working at airports, nuclear sites, on protection duties, and deployed in armed response vehicles in certain areas, standing authority is granted to carry personal side arms. All members of the Police Service of Northern Ireland have authority to carry a personal issue handgun as a matter of routine, on and off duty. In all forces, usage of other weapons such as semi-automatic carbines requires further training and authorisation. Semi-automatic carbines are stored in a locked armoury inside an armed response vehicle.

United Kingdom law allows the use of "reasonable force" in order to make an arrest or prevent a crime or to defend oneself. However, if the force used is fatal, then the European Convention on Human Rights only allows "the use of force which is no more than absolutely necessary". Firearms officers may therefore only discharge their weapons "to stop an imminent threat to life".

ACPO policy states that use of a firearm includes both pointing it at a person and discharging it (whether accidentally, negligently or deliberately).
As with all use of force in England and Wales, the onus is on the individual officer to justify their actions in court.

See also

Firearms unit

References

Types of police unit of the United Kingdom